The South Orange/Maplewood Community Coalition on Race is an intentional integration organization located in Maplewood and South Orange, New Jersey.  Founded in 1996 as the Racial Balance Task Force by the governing bodies of the two towns, it is a grass roots non-profit with 501(c)(3) status that works to  make the two Essex County towns and their shared school system truly inclusive and integrated into the future.

References

"Selling a Rainbow and a Pot of Gold" The New York Times, New York, 13 April 2003.  Retrieved on 9 January 2016.
"Conversations on Race, a community-wide conversation on integration" The New Metropolis May, 2011.  Retrieved on 9 January 2016.
"A Model for America: Racial Integration in South Orange, New Jersey. Masters Thesis by Nichole Nelson"  [Graduate School of Vanderbilt University, Nashville, Tennessee, August 2014.  Retrieved 9 January 2016.

Organizations based in New Jersey
Maplewood, New Jersey
South Orange, New Jersey